Bulsatcom is Bulgarian satellite television, internet & mobile operator, founded in 2000 as the first DVB-S operator in the country. The company is operated from Sofia and Stara Zagora. Since 2009 it has entered the internet service provisioning market and since 2015 the company also provides 4G LTE mobile data services.
The company is currently the biggest in term of number of pay-TV subscribers in Bulgaria and has added in early 2015 IPTV services to its product portfolio. From the beginning Bulsatcom's slogan was: "Digital television at home", but after they changed their logo in 2013, the slogan is now: "Your digital world"

Services
 Fixed telephony
 DVB-S
 IPTV
 Broadband Internet

External links
 

Telecommunications companies of Bulgaria